The 2007 IIHF World U18 Championships was an ice hockey tournament held in Rauma and Tampere, Finland. The championships began on April 11, 2007 and finished on April 22, 2007. Games were played at Äijänsuo Arena in Rauma and Tampere Ice Stadium in Tampere. Russia defeated the United States 6–5 in the final to claim the gold medal, while Sweden defeated Canada 8–3 to capture the bronze medal.

Top Division

Preliminary round

Group A

Group B

Relegation round

Final round

Bracket

Quarterfinals

Semifinals

Fifth place game

Bronze medal game

Final

Statistics

Scoring leaders

GP = Games played; G = Goals; A = Assists; Pts = Points; +/− = Plus-minus; PIM = Penalties In MinutesSource: IIHF

Goaltending leaders
(minimum 40% team's total ice time)

TOI = Time on ice (minutes:seconds); GA = Goals against; GAA = Goals against average; SA = Shots against; Sv% = Save percentage; SO = ShutoutsSource: IIHF

Awards
Best players selected by the Directorate:
Best Goaltender:  Josh Unice
Best Defenceman:  Kevin Shattenkirk
Best Forward:  James van Riemsdyk
Source: IIHF 

Media All-Stars:
Goaltender:  Josh Unice
Defensemen:  Victor Hedman /   Kevin Shattenkirk
Forwards:  Alexei Cherepanov /  Steven Stamkos /  James van Riemsdyk
MVP:  James van Riemsdyk
Source: IIHF

Final standings

Division I

Division I consisted of two separate tournaments. The Group A tournament was held between 6 April and 12 April 2007 in Maribor, Slovenia and the Group B tournament was held between 4 April and 10 April 2007 in Sanok, Poland. Belarus and Denmark won the Group A and Group B tournaments respectively and gained promotion to the Championship Division for the 2007 IIHF World U18 Championships. While France finished last in Group A and Great Britain last in Group B and were both relegated to Division II for 2007.

Final standings

Group A
 — promoted to Championship Division for 2008

 — relegated to Division II for 2008

Group B
 — promoted to Championship Division for 2008

 — relegated to Division II for 2008

Division II

Division II consisted of two separate tournaments. The Group A tournament was held between 15 and 21 April 2007 in Miskolc, Hungary and the Group B tournament was held between 12 and 18 March 2006 in Miercurea Ciuc, Romania. Netherlands and Lithuania won the Group A and Group B tournaments respectively and gained promotion to Division I for the 2008 IIHF World U18 Championships. While Mexico finished last in Group A and Serbia last in Group B and were both relegated to Division III for 2008.

Final standings

Group A
 — promoted to Division I for 2008

 — relegated to Division III for 2008

Group B
 — promoted to Division I for 2008

 — relegated to Division III for 2008

Division III

The Division III tournament was held between 5 and 11 March 2007 in Beijing, China. Spain and China finished first and second respectively and both gained promotion to Division II for the 2008 IIHF World U18 Championships.

Final standings
 — promoted to Division II for 2008
 — promoted to Division II for 2008

Division III Qualification
The Division III Qualification tournament was held on 28 January 2007 in İzmit, Turkey. Turkey won the tournament and qualified for the Division III tournament after winning the game against Bulgaria 3–2 in a shootout.

Final standings
 — qualified for the 2007 Division III tournament

References

External links
Official results and statistics from the International Ice Hockey Federation
Championship
Division I – Group A
Division I – Group B
Division II – Group A
Division II – Group B
Division III
Division IIIQ

 
IIHF World U18 Championships
IIHF World U18 Championships
IIHF World U18 Championships
2007
World
April 2007 sports events in Europe